I'll Take Manhattan is a 1986 bonkbuster novel by American author Judith Krantz. It has been cited as her best novel because it is the one most closely rooted in her own experience as a writer and socialite. 

The book was adapted into a CBS television miniseries, I'll Take Manhattan, in 1987.

References

1986 American novels
Novels by Judith Krantz
American novels adapted into films
Donald Trump in popular culture